The Division of Cook is an Australian electoral division in the State of New South Wales.

History

Cook was created in 1969, mostly out of the Liberal-leaning areas of neighbouring Hughes. It was thus a natural choice for that seat's one-term Liberal member, Don Dobie, to transfer after the creation of Cook erased his majority in Hughes. The division was named in honour of James Cook, who mapped the east coast of Australia in 1770. In 2006, the Australian Electoral Commission's Redistribution Committee for New South Wales proposed that the division be jointly named for Joseph Cook, the sixth Prime Minister of Australia from 1913 to 1914. However as of 2022 no such action has been taken, and therefore Joseph Cook remains the only eligible Prime Minister who does not have a federal electorate named after him.

For most of the first quarter-century of its existence, Cook was a marginal to fairly safe Liberal seat; it has been in Liberal hands for all but two terms. The Liberal majority ballooned with the party's national landslide victory at the 1996 general election, and since then Cook has been a "blue ribbon" safe seat for the Liberal Party. As of the 2019 federal election, it is the safest metropolitan Coalition seat, with a 19-point swing needed for Labor to win it.

The most prominent members were Dobie, who held the seat from its 1969 creation until his retirement in 1996 (with a brief break from 1972 to 1975); Bruce Baird, a former Deputy Leader of the Liberal Party of New South Wales before his move into Federal politics; and the current member, Scott Morrison MP, former Prime Minister of Australia 2018-2022.

In 2007, following news of Baird's impending retirement, the seat attracted significant media attention, thanks to the controversial preselection of Liberal candidate Michael Towke. Allegations surfaced to the effect that Towke had engaged in branch-stacking and had embellished his curriculum vitae; although these allegations were subsequently proven false, the damage was done. In August 2007, Towke was disendorsed as the Liberal candidate and was replaced with Morrison, a former director of the New South Wales Liberal Party. Morrison won the seat at the election and is the current sitting member.

Boundaries
Since 1984, federal electoral division boundaries in Australia have been determined at redistributions by a redistribution committee appointed by the Australian Electoral Commission. Redistributions occur for the boundaries of divisions in a particular state, and they occur every seven years, or sooner if a state's representation entitlement changes or when divisions of a state are malapportioned.

The division is located in the southern suburbs of Sydney, including Beverley Park, Burraneer, Caringbah, Caringbah South, Carss Park, Cronulla, Dolans Bay, Dolls Point, Greenhills Beach, Gymea Bay, Kangaroo Point, Kogarah Bay, Kurnell, Kyle Bay, Lilli Pilli, Miranda, Monterey, Port Hacking, Ramsgate, Ramsgate Beach, Sandringham, Sans Souci, Sylvania Waters, Taren Point, Woolooware, and Yowie Bay; as well as parts of Blakehurst, Connells Point, Gymea, Kogarah, and Sylvania.

Members

Election results

References

External links
 Division of Cook - Australian Electoral Commission

Electoral divisions of Australia
Constituencies established in 1969
1969 establishments in Australia